Judge Clark may refer to:

Bennett Champ Clark (1890–1954), judge of the District of Columbia Circuit
Charles Clark (judge) (1925–2011), judge of the United States Court of Appeals for the Fifth Circuit
Charles Dickens Clark (1847–1908), judge of the United States District Courts for the Eastern and Middle Districts of Tennessee
Charles Edward Clark (1889–1963), judge of the United States Court of Appeals for the Second Circuit
Chase A. Clark (1883–1966), judge of the United States District Court for the District of Idaho
Daniel Clark (New Hampshire politician) (1809–1891), judge of the United States District Court for the District of New Hampshire
Ron Clark (judge) (born 1953), judge of the United States District Court for the Eastern District of Texas
Russell Gentry Clark (1925–2003), judge of the United States District Court for the Western District of Missouri
Stephen R. Clark (born 1966), judge of the United States District Court for the Eastern District of Missouri
Thomas Alonzo Clark (1920–2005), judge of the United States Courts of Appeals for the Fifth and Eleventh Circuits
William Clark (judge) (1891–1957), judge of the United States Court of Appeals for the Third Circuit

See also
John Hessin Clarke (1857–1945), judge of the United States District Court for the Northern District of Ohio before becoming a justice of the United States Supreme Court 
Joseph Calvitt Clarke Jr. (1920–2004), judge of the United States District Court for the Eastern District of Virginia
Thurmond Clarke (1902–1971), judge of the United States District Courts for the Southern and Central Districts of California
Justice Clark (disambiguation)
Justice Clarke (disambiguation)